Elections to Liverpool City Council were held on Monday 1 November 1880. One third of the council seats were up for election, the term of office of each councillor being three years.

After the election, the composition of the council was:

Election result

Ward results

* - Retiring Councillor seeking re-election

Abercromby

Castle Street

Everton

Exchange

Great George

Lime Street

North Toxteth

Pitt Street

Rodney Street

St. Anne Street

St. Paul's

St. Peter's

Scotland

South Toxteth

Vauxhall

West Derby

Aldermanic Elections

At the meeting of the Council on 9 November 1880, the terms of office of eight 
alderman expired.  The following eight were elected as Aldermen by the Council (Aldermen and Councillors) on 9 November 1880 for a term of six years.

* - re-elected aldermen.

By-elections

No. 6, Castle Street, 21 March 1881

Caused by the death of Councillor William Crossfield (Liberal, Castle Street, 
elected 1 November 1878), 

which was reported to the Council meeting on 2 March 1881.

No. 4, St. Paul's, 4 April 1881

Caused by the result of the election for the St. Paul's ward on 1 November 1879 
being declared void under the Corrupt Practices (Municipal Elections) Act, 1872.
Andrew Patterson, the Agent for George Curzon Dobell (Conservative),  was found to 
have given 5 shillings to Catherine Tallon in order to induce her to vote for 
George Curzon Dobell.

No. 12, Lime Street, 4 April 1881

Caused by the result of the election for the Lime Street ward on 1 November 1879 
being declared void under the Corrupt Practices (Municipal Elections) Act, 1872.
Edward Dobson, the Agent for James Alexander Forrest (Conservative), was found to 
have given a pair of gloves to Martha Wilson in order to induce her to vote for James Alexander Forrest.

No. 6, Castle Street, 11 May 1881

No. 10, Rodney Street, 11 May 1881

No. 9, Great George, 26 May 1881

No. 16, North Toxteth, 17 June 1881

Caused by the resignation of Councillor Lieutenant-Colonel Richard Fell Steble 
(Conservative, North Toxteth, elected 1 November 1878).

No. 4, St. Paul's, 4 July 1881

See also

 Liverpool City Council
 Liverpool Town Council elections 1835 - 1879
 Liverpool City Council elections 1880–present
 Mayors and Lord Mayors of Liverpool 1207 to present
 History of local government in England

References

1880
1880 English local elections
1880s in Liverpool